Millhouses is a district of Barnsley in the English county of South Yorkshire.

Millhouses adjoins the town of Darfield near the A635 road to the east of Barnsley itself. The district falls within the Darfield Ward of the MBC.

External links 

Villages in South Yorkshire
Geography of the Metropolitan Borough of Barnsley